Folignano is a comune (municipality) in the Province of Ascoli Piceno in the Italian region Marche, located about  south of Ancona and about  southeast of Ascoli Piceno.

The municipality of Folignano contains the frazioni (subdivisions, mainly villages and hamlets) Castel Folignano, Case di Coccia, Sant'Antonio, San Cipriano, San Benedetto, Piane di Morro and Villa Pigna.

Folignano borders the following municipalities: Ascoli Piceno, Civitella del Tronto, Maltignano, Sant'Egidio alla Vibrata.

The historical center of the town is divided in several zone: Capolavilla (head of the town), Spiazzo (Square), Colle Pasquale (Pasquale hill), Pielavilla (feet of the town).

Demographic evolution

References

External links
 www.comunedifolignano.it

Cities and towns in the Marche